Jaan Tiks (16 December 1887 Viljandi – 14 May 1942 Suure-Jaani) was an Estonian politician. He was a member of I Riigikogu. He was a member of the Riigikogu since 6 December 1921. He replaced Artur Liiberg.

References

1887 births
1942 deaths
People from Viljandi
People from Kreis Fellin
Estonian Social Democratic Workers' Party politicians
Estonian Socialist Workers' Party politicians
Members of the Riigikogu, 1920–1923
Members of the Riigikogu, 1923–1926
Members of the Riigikogu, 1926–1929